Liberty Township Schoolhouse No. 2 is a historic one-room school building located in Liberty Township, Shelby County, Indiana. It was built in 1875, and is a one-story, rectangular, Italianate style brick building.  It has a steep gable-front roof and features heavy scroll brackets, a scalloped frieze, and oculus vent.  Also on the property is a contributing water pump.  It remained in use as a school until about 1919.

It was listed on the National Register of Historic Places in 1992.

References

One-room schoolhouses in Indiana
School buildings on the National Register of Historic Places in Indiana
Italianate architecture in Indiana
School buildings completed in 1875
Schools in Shelby County, Indiana
National Register of Historic Places in Shelby County, Indiana